CPAM may refer to:

 Caisse primaire d'assurances maladie, a primary health insurance fund in France.
 Center for Performing Arts Medicine
 Center for Pure and Applied Mathematics
 Certified Patient Account Manager
 Certified Public Accountant in Malawi
 Christian Petersen Art Museum at Iowa State University
 College Park Aviation Museum
 Communications on Pure and Applied Mathematics
 Community Pesticide Action Monitoring
 Concrete Paving Association of Minnesota
 Concrete Pipe Association of Michigan
 Congenital pulmonary airway malformation
 Continental Polar Air Mass
 Continuous particulate air monitor
 Council of Presidential Awardees of Mathematics, an organization of recipients of the Presidential Award for Excellence in Mathematics and Science Teaching
 Crime Prevention Association of Michigan
 Cross-Platform Application Management

See also
CJWI on 1410 AM also known as CPAM Radio Union or CPAM 1410 - a French-language Canadian radio station located in Montreal, Quebec with mainly Haitian programming, but also the Latin American and French-speaking African communities